Huyanghe is a county-level city in Xinjiang Uyghur Autonomous Region, China. It is geographically located in Tacheng Prefecture of Northwestern Xinjiang, but is directly administered by the 7th Division of XPCC.

The city was formerly the settled and cultivated areas of the 130th Regiment of the 7th Division of the Xinjiang Production and Construction Corps (XPCC).

References

County-level divisions of Xinjiang
2019 establishments in China
Populated places established in 2019
Xinjiang Production and Construction Corps
Populated places in Xinjiang